Defence Business Services (DBS) is one of the largest ‘Shared Services Centres’ in Europe and was initially set up to deliver Corporate HR, Payroll, Armed Forces Pensions and Compensation, Finance, Vetting and Information Services across the Ministry of Defence (MOD).

History
DBS is an organisation within the UK Government's Ministry of Defence and is responsible for providing corporate services to the department. It was established on 4 July 2011 by bringing together several MOD executive agencies.

References

External links
 Veterans UK on Gov.UK

Defence agencies of the United Kingdom
Serco